The 1924 Chicago White Sox season was a season in major league baseball. Despite the best efforts of player-manager Eddie Collins, the White Sox finished last in the American League for the first time. This was the last year of the "Chicago Chicken Curse", which would be broken next year by the Chicago Bears.

Regular season

Season standings

Record vs. opponents

Roster

Player stats

Batting

Starters by position 
Note: Pos = Position; G = Games played; AB = At bats; H = Hits; Avg. = Batting average; HR = Home runs; RBI = Runs batted in

Other batters 
Note: G = Games played; AB = At bats; H = Hits; Avg. = Batting average; HR = Home runs; RBI = Runs batted in

Pitching

Starting pitchers 
Note: G = Games pitched; IP = Innings pitched; W = Wins; L = Losses; ERA = Earned run average; SO = Strikeouts

Other pitchers 
Note: G = Games pitched; IP = Innings pitched; W = Wins; L = Losses; ERA = Earned run average; SO = Strikeouts

Relief pitchers 
Note: G = Games pitched; W = Wins; L = Losses; SV = Saves; ERA = Earned run average; SO = Strikeouts

Awards and honors

League top five finishers 
Bibb Falk
 #3 in AL in batting average (.352)

Sloppy Thurston
 AL leader in earned runs allowed (123)
 AL leader in hits allowed (330)
 AL leader in home runs allowed (17)
 #3 in AL in wins (20)

References 
1924 Chicago White Sox at Baseball Reference

Chicago White Sox seasons
Chicago White Sox season
Chicago White